The Times is a Gannett daily newspaper based in Shreveport, Louisiana. Its distribution area includes 12 parishes in Northwest Louisiana and three counties in East Texas. Its coverage focuses on issues affecting the Shreveport-Bossier market, and includes investigative reporting, community news, arts and entertainment, government, education, sports, business, and religion, along with local opinion/commentary. Its website provides news updates, videos, photo galleries, forums, blogs, event calendars, entertainment, classifieds, contests, databases, and a regional search engine. Local news content produced by The Times is available on the website at no charge for seven days.

History

From 1895 to 1991, The Times had competition from the afternoon Monday-Saturday daily, the since defunct Shreveport Journal. The papers were later printed at the same 222 Lake Street address and shared opposite sides of the building, but were entirely separate and independent of the other. Publisher Charles T. Beaird, effective March 30, 1991, closed the Shreveport Journal for financial reasons stemming from sharply reduced circulation.<ref>"Shreveport Journal ends publication after 96 years:, Minden Press-Herald', March 31, 1991, p. 1.</ref> Thereafter, the page opposite the editorial page of The Times, commonly called the op-ed page, was reserved as "The Journal Page" for editorial comment until December 31, 1999.

Beginning in October 2017, The Times was no longer locally published because the distribution center in Shreveport closed to reduce production and labor costs. The Times  instead is printed at another Gannett publication, the Longview News-Journal in Longview, Texas, a commute of 65 miles one-way. The Monroe News-Star, which had been published in Shreveport, is printed at the Jackson Clarion-Ledger in Jackson, Mississippi. The change is not expected to impact delivery schedules.

 Sections 
 Main news (first section)
 Local
 Sports
 Classifieds
 Outlook(Sundays)
 Flavor (Wednesdays)
 Arts, culture and entertainment (Thursdays)
 Lagniappe (Home, garden and weekend guide) (Fridays)
 Autos (Saturdays and Sundays)
 Living (Sundays)
 Real Estate (Sundays)
 CareerBuilder (Sundays)
 Business (Sundays)
 Comics + TV Times (Sundays)
 High School Sports (in football season on Fridays and Saturdays)
 LSU section (in football season on Sundays)
 NFL section (in football season on Mondays)

Publications and websites
 The Times  daily newspaper
 shreveporttimes.com  Online news and information
 LSUBeat.com  Online news and information on LSU sports

 Get Healthy new monthly health news
 Red River Moms magazine  monthly parenting and child information
 CareerBuilder Weekly  weekly employment listings and career advice
 Cars.com NUMBER ONE source for new and used cars in NWLA
 Homefinder Top local real estate section (weekly on Sundays)

See also

 H. M. Fowler, former mayor of Coushatta and a member of the Louisiana House of Representatives from 1972 to 1986, delivered The Shreveport Times in Coushatta in the 1950s.

References

External links

 The Shreveport Times official site
 Official mobile website

Publications established in 1871
Newspapers published in Louisiana
Gannett publications
Mass media in Shreveport, Louisiana
Caddo Parish, Louisiana
1871 establishments in Louisiana